Nikos Kourkounas (born 5 January 1966) is a Greek professional football manager and former player.

References

1966 births
Living people
Greek footballers
Apollon Smyrnis F.C. players
Panelefsiniakos F.C. players
Ionikos F.C. players
Ethnikos Piraeus F.C. players
Association football goalkeepers
Super League Greece players
Greek football managers
Apollon Smyrnis F.C. managers
Olympiacos Volos F.C. managers